The 2020 Massachusetts Democratic presidential primary took place on March 3, as one of 15 contests scheduled on Super Tuesday in the Democratic Party primaries for the 2020 presidential election, following the South Carolina primary the weekend before. The Massachusetts primary was a semi-closed primary, with the state awarding 114 delegates towards the 2020 Democratic National Convention, of which 91 were pledged delegates allocated on the basis of the results of the primary.

While senators Bernie Sanders and Elizabeth Warren had been thoroughly projected in all pre-election polls and forecasts to compete for victory till the last day, former vice president Joe Biden, who had barely polled over 15% in the state, made an enormous surge and won by a large margin with over 33% of the vote and 37 delegates, continuing his string of Super Tuesday victories. One of the greatest upsets of the night, Biden most certainly owed his success to the last minute endorsements from former Democratic opponents Pete Buttigieg, Amy Klobuchar and Beto O'Rourke after his South Carolina win. Sanders finished behind in second place with nearly 27% and 30 delegates, while Warren's third-place finish in her home state with around 21% of the vote and 24 delegates was regarded the final crush to her candidacy. Former mayor Michael Bloomberg did not manage to win any delegates.

Procedure
Massachusetts was one of 14 states and one territory holding primaries on March 3, 2020, also known as "Super Tuesday". Voting took place throughout the state from 7:00 a.m. until 8:00 p.m. in much of the state, with some precincts opening at 5:45 a.m. In the semi-closed primary, candidates had to meet a threshold of 15 percent at the congressional district or statewide level to be considered viable. The 91 pledged delegates to the 2020 Democratic National Convention were allocated proportionally on the basis of the results of the primary. Of these, between 6 and 8 were allocated to each of the state's 9 congressional districts and another 12 were allocated to party leaders and elected officials (PLEO delegates), in addition to 20 at-large delegates.). The Super Tuesday primary as part of Stage I on the primary timetable received no bonus delegates, in order to disperse the primaries between more different date clusters and keep too many states from hoarding on the first shared date or on a March date in general.

After congressional district caucuses on April 25, 2020, during which national convention district delegates were selected, the state party committee met on May 16, 2020 and voted on the 20 at-large and 12 pledged PLEO delegates for the Democratic National Convention. The delegation was joined by 23 unpledged PLEO delegates: 9 members of the Democratic National Committee, 11 members of Congress (both senators, notably Elizabeth Warren, and 9 representatives, including former candidate Seth Moulton), as well as former DNC chairs Steven Grossman, Debra DeLee, and Paul G. Kirk.

Candidates
The Massachusetts Secretary of the Commonwealth released the following list of candidates on the ballot:

Running

Joe Biden
Michael Bloomberg
Tulsi Gabbard
Bernie Sanders
Elizabeth Warren

Withdrawn

Michael Bennet
Cory Booker
Pete Buttigieg
Julian Castro
John Delaney
Amy Klobuchar
Deval Patrick
Tom Steyer
Marianne Williamson
Andrew Yang

There were also a write-in option and a "no preference" option on the ballot.

Polling

Results

Results by county

Analysis 

According to exit polls, Biden overwhelmingly won voters over 50, followed by Warren, while Sanders did the same with voters under 40. Voters between the ages of 40 and 49 years old were split between Biden (32%) and Sanders (31%). Biden also won white voters by 8 points over Sanders and African-American voters by 7 points, while Sanders won the Hispanic/Latino vote over Biden by 13 points. Sanders also won the LGBTQ+ voters over Warren and Biden by 12 and 23 points respectively.

Biden carried 7 of the state's 9 congressional districts: the 1st, 3rd, 4th (where Biden got his widest margin of victory), 5th, 6th, 8th, and the 9th. Sanders carried the remaining districts. The one comprised by the Boston-Metro Area showed the best performance for Sanders, and was the only district where Warren finished second. This was a change from the pre-election prediction that Biden would do better in this district and Sanders worse.

Notes
Polling Notes

See also
 2020 Massachusetts Republican presidential primary

References

External links
The Green Papers delegate allocation summary
Massachusetts Democratic Party delegate selection plan 
FiveThirtyEight Massachusetts primary poll tracker

Massachusetts Democratic
Democratic primary
2020